Mohamed Jasim Al-Maqabi (born 14 July 1988) is a Bahraini handball player for Al-Ahli and the Bahraini national team.

He participated at the 2017 World Men's Handball Championship.

References

1988 births
Living people
Bahraini male handball players
Expatriate handball players
Asian Games medalists in handball
Asian Games bronze medalists for Bahrain
Medalists at the 2014 Asian Games
Handball players at the 2014 Asian Games
21st-century Bahraini people